Pavonia × gledhillii is an evergreen flowering plant in the mallow family, Malvaceae.

Etymology
The generic name honours Spanish botanist José Antonio Pavón Jiménez (1754–1844). The epithet  gledhillii come from Dr. David Gledhill, curator in 1989 of University of Bristol Botanic Garden.

Description
Pavonia × gledhillii is a 19th-century hybrid of Pavonia makoyana, E. Morrem and Pavonia multiflora, A. Juss., often incorrectly confused with Pavonia multiflora.

This subshrub is intermediate  between the two species of origin in almost all respects, but it has nine to ten equal broad bracts and sub-entire leaf margins. The unusual flowers are  purple-grey enclosed within a bright red  calyx. Flowering period is late Summer.

Gallery

References

 M. Cheek – A New Name for a South American Pavonia (Malvaceae) – Kew Bulletin  – Vol. 44, No. 1, 1989

External links

Hibisceae
Hybrid plants